Sören Tallhem (born 16 February 1964) is a Swedish athlete. He competed in the men's shot put at the 1984 Summer Olympics and the 1992 Summer Olympics.

References

1964 births
Living people
Athletes (track and field) at the 1984 Summer Olympics
Athletes (track and field) at the 1992 Summer Olympics
Swedish male shot putters
Olympic athletes of Sweden
Place of birth missing (living people)